Mahmut Nedim [Hendek] (1880; Caucasus - April 21, 1920; Hendek) was an officer of the Ottoman Army and the Turkish Army.

Medals and decorations
Gallipoli Star (Ottoman Empire)
Medal of Independence with Red Ribbon
Order of the Medjidie 5th class

See also
List of high-ranking commanders of the Turkish War of Independence

Sources

1880 births
1920 deaths
People from the Ottoman Empire of Circassian descent
Turkish people of Circassian descent
Ottoman Military Academy alumni
Ottoman Military College alumni
Ottoman Army officers
Ottoman military personnel of the Italo-Turkish War
Ottoman military personnel of the Balkan Wars
Ottoman military personnel of World War I
Turkish Army officers
Turkish military personnel of the Greco-Turkish War (1919–1922)
Turkish military personnel killed in action
Burials at Turkish State Cemetery
Recipients of the Order of the Medjidie, 5th class
Recipients of the Medal of Independence with Red Ribbon (Turkey)